Thera Halli is a village in Karnataka, India. It is situated on top of the Antara Gange hill near Kolar. There is an ancient temple dedicated to Shiva situated in the Mountain. "Thera Halli" literally means "village that is suspended" in Kannada.

References

Villages in Kolar district